Heart & Soul is the sixth studio album by English boy band Blue, released on 28 October 2022 through Tag8 and BMG.

Background
In early 2020, Blue flew to Sweden to write new music with Dsign Music members Anne Judith Wik and Ronny Svendsen. While the band had no plan to do another album, the sessions produced five finished songs, including what would become lead single "Haven't Found You Yet." Satisfied with the output, the band felt motivated to continue recording, though they were later forced to relocate recording to London due to the COVID-19 pandemic, with much of their vocals recorded separately. Speaking about the album, Blue said while they never expected to make another album, they ended up working with their old producer Hugh Goldsmith again, saying "Our career started with Hugh so it's nice to come back and work with him again. He's got an amazing understanding of music."

Promotion
"Haven't Found You Yet," which the band has described as "the album's strongest contender, a mix of the classic blues with a great modern twist," was released as the album's first single on 25 May 2022 Accompanied by a music video directed by Jackson Ducasse, it debuted and reached number 61 on the UK Singles Downloads Chart. "Dance with Me," a cover version of the 2001 song by American group 112, was released as the album's second single on 29 June 2022. The band has cited their version an as an homage to "Too Close," another R&B cover that Blue had recorded in 2001. "Magnetic," serving as the album's third single, was released on 16 September 2022, followed by a fourth single, title track "Heart & Soul," for which a lyric video, also directed by Ducasse, was issued on 4 October 2022.

Critical reception

Retro Pop said "Covering a range of styles inherent to the band's repertoire, Heart & Soul sees Blue do what they do best and on Heart & Soul they succeed in regrouping for an album that dabbles in nostalgia while continuing to push their sound." Ben Devlin from musicOMH found that on Heart & Soul, the "re-energised boyband's natural chemistry finds them putting their own spin on a pot-luck array of contemporary styles." Pip Ellwood-Hughes, writing for Entertainment Focus, called Heart & Soul "their best album in years" and "one of, if not the, best pop album of 2022 (so far)." He found that the album "sees the four-piece getting back into the groove mixing classic elements of the Blue sound with contemporary sounds." Lucy Case from Renowned for Sound found that while a few songs "do feel slightly dated," Heart & Soul was "a great new collection of modern hits [...] showcasing their powerful harmonies and working on a more modern sound to suit 2022."

Chart performance
The Official Charts Company predicted that Heart & Soul would enter the UK Top 100 Albums Chart at number 10. In doing so, Blue would score their highest album chart entry since 2003's Guilty. However, when the official chart for that week was announced on 4 November 2022, it showed Heart & Soul had debuted at number 22 on the UK Top 100; making it the group's lowest-charting album to date. Heart & Soul also reached number 4 on the UK Independent Albums chart, and peaked at number 18 on the Scottish Albums Chart.

Track listing

Notes
  signifies a vocal producer

Personnel
Performers and musicians

	
Steve DuBerry – bass, drums, guitar, keyboards, piano, backing vocals
Lewis Shay Jankel – bass, drums, guitar
Ronny Svendsen – guitar, organ, piano, drum programming, synthesizer
	
Paul Visser – piano, programming
Anne Judith Wik – backing vocals
Chris Young – piano
	

Technical

	
Ben Collier – producer
Steve DuBerry – engineer, producer
Ben Cartwright – vocal producer
Lewis Shay Jankel – engineer, producer
	
Ronny Svendsen – engineer, producer
Kevin Tuffy – engineer
Paul Visser – engineer, producer
Chris Young – engineer, producer

Charts

Release history

References

2022 albums
Blue (English band) albums